Phoebe Greenberg is a Canadian film producer. She is the daughter of Irving Greenberg, one of the founders of Minto Group in 1955 and Shirley Greenberg, a pioneer in the Canadian feminist movement. She is also the mother of artist Miles Greenberg.

Biography 
Phoebe Greenberg established the PHI ecosystem in Montreal, Canada, with the mission to engage the public with the most relevant ideas of our time. The PHI ecosystem consists of the PHI Foundation for Contemporary Art (2007, formerly DHC/ART), the PHI Centre (2012), and the PHI Studio (2019). The founding of these organizations brought a fresh cultural offering to the west-end neighborhood of Old Montreal, a historically disenfranchised area. As a go-to institution, PHI's presence in the city as a progressive organization with an eye to the future is continually reinforced by the role it plays as an urban catalyst for the development of ideas and culture.

Originally from Ottawa, Canada, Phoebe Greenberg is a graduate of the Jacques Lecoq International Theater School in Paris, an institution that emphasizes the body, movement, and space at the heart of theatrical performance. After working almost two decades in theater, Greenberg turned her keen and burgeoning interest towards contemporary art. The PHI Foundation for Contemporary Art, the first entity under the banner of PHI, was thus established in 2007 by the cultural protagonist, exhibiting works from around the world to contextualize the contemporary art experience. It was her insightful response (especially within the institutional climate of the city and era) to invest not solely in the art itself but rather to focus on creating cultural infrastructure to facilitate a dialogue between contemporary art and the public.

Akin to the ‘kunsthalle’ model, the PHI Foundation became a non-collecting institution exhibiting contemporary art. While common in Europe, this model was and remains entirely foreign within the North American, and certainly Montreal, context. Driven by her desire to make art accessible and part of everyday life, Greenberg committed to ensuring that this infrastructure would be free to the public.

In 2012 Greenberg established the PHI Centre to champion projects at the crossroads of art, cinema, music, virtual reality and augmented reality, exploring new territories of storytelling by producing installations informed by new media, research and experimentation. Greenberg's first virtual reality work was a collaboration with Felix & Paul Studios with Patrick Watson in 2015. Strangers was a one-on-one encounter with the celebrated musician at his Montreal studio. PHI Studio (2019), the third entity of PHI's ecosystem, develops innovative exhibitions and captivating immersive experiences presented internationally at world-class venues, challenging the existing distribution models.

PHI Studio (2019), the third entity in the PHI ecosystem, develops innovative exhibitions and compelling immersive experiences presented internationally in world-class venues, challenging existing distribution models.

Greenberg is currently spearheading the development of PHI's newest chapter, a strategic roadmap for PHI's heritage: PHI Contemporary. Poised to be the next cultural landmark of Montreal, the new institution will consolidate the full breadth of PHI's public cultural offer (currently distributed between the PHI Centre and the PHI Foundation) to create a space dedicated to probing the most relevant ideas of our times.

PHI Foundation for Contemporary Art 
Passionate about contemporary art, Greenberg first founded the PHI Foundation for Contemporary Art (formerly known as DHC/ART) in 2007, dedicated to the dissemination of contemporary art both locally and internationally. The program offers two to three major exhibitions per year, educational activities, interdisciplinary collaborative projects and public events. All activities offered by the Foundation are free of charge to the public.

In March 2019, DHC/ART changed its name to the PHI Foundation for Contemporary Art in response to the desire of Phoebe Greenberg, Founder and Chief Creative Officer, to unite the growing cultural infrastructure and offer under the banner of PHI.

Over the past years, the PHI Foundation has had the opportunity to present world-renowned artists such as Marc Quinn, Sophie Calle, John Currin, Ryoji Ikeda, Jake & Dinos Chapman, Jenny Holzer, Björk, Yoko Ono and many others. In celebration of its 15th anniversary, the PHI Foundation will welcome Japanese artist Yayoi Kusama in 2022.

PHI Centre 
In 2012, Greenberg set up the PHI Centre, a multidisciplinary artistic and cultural hub. The institution brings together visual arts, cinema, music, design and new technologies, in order to encourage encounters between disciplines, as well as between artists and the public. Through this program which aims to be innovative and inspiring, the public is called upon to participate in a reflection on art in its new forms. The PHI Centre aims for its programming to be unique, unclassifiable, engaging and constantly evolving, but always relevant. The PHI Centre hosted, among others, the Red Bull Music Academy, Chili Gonzales, Yasiin Bey (formally known as Mos Def), Nick Cave, Arthur H and Denis Villeneuve with his short film Next Floor, a cinematic work filmed and inspired by the building that now houses the PHI Centre  before its reconstruction in 2008. The PHI Centre has presented numerous exhibitions, immersive theater experiences, and music performances, including the following:

 In the mouth (2014), a culinary experience focusing on the five senses;
 Alice: The Virtual Reality (2019), a wacky immersive play based on Lewis Carroll's classic Alice's Adventures in Wonderland;
 Believe your eyes (2017), another immersive work by the famous British group Punchdrunk;
 Echo: The Sound of Space (2018); an immersive exhibition featuring Spheres, a virtual reality experience by Eliza McNitt;
 Cadavres Exquis (2019), an exhibition that featured major contemporary artists including Marina Abramović, Olafur Eliasson, Laurie Anderson, Antony Gormley and Paul McCarthy;
 >HUM(AI)N (2019);
 Jim Carrey: This Light Never Goes Out (2019), an exhibition about comedian actor Jim Carrey;
 The Horrifically Real Virtuality (2019), a new type of experience combining theater and new technologies in the universe of Ed Wood;
 We Live in an Ocean of Air (2021–22), an immersive experience from British studio Marshmallow Laser Feast;
 Lashing Skies (Ciel à outrances) (2022), an experience by Brigitte Poupart and based on the poetic suite by Madeleine Monette.

PHI Studio 
The PHI Studio (established in 2019), the third entity in the PHI ecosystem, develops innovative exhibitions and captivating immersive experiences presented locally and internationally.

PHI deploys its expertise in presenting state-of-the-art works abroad, through initiatives such as showing at the Rockefeller Center in New York City, the Tribeca Film Festival, programming and production of the Virtual Reality Pavilion at the Luxembourg City Film Festival as well as an ephemeral gallery during the 58th Venice Biennale.

2021 was a big year for PHI Studio marked by two large immersive installations: CARNE y ARENA by the internationally renowned Mexican filmmaker Alejandro G. Iñárritu, and THE INFINITE (in collaboration with Felix & Paul Studios and TIME Studios), the largest virtual reality experience on space exploration.

These two immersive installations have made it possible to export and affirm Quebecois talent and position Montreal as a cultural metropolis.

PHI Contemporary 
Opening its doors in 2026, PHI Contemporary will be an institution dedicated to the ongoing exploration of the contemporary through art and culture. The project will consolidate the full breadth of PHI's public cultural offer – currently distributed between the PHI Foundation and the PHI Centre – under one roof.

Carefully and critically curated exhibitions will meet vanguard works from burgeoning creative territories, allowing PHI to fully explore the emergent synergies and curatorial opportunities they represent. Housing exhibition spaces and a generous public domain, the project represents a new cultural infrastructure for the public to engage with PHI's multi-dimensional presentation of art, discourse and creative practices. This new cultural landmark will engage with the local community, visitors to the city of Montreal and PHI's ever expanding network.

The site 
From the Pre-contact era to the Colonization era, the site of PHI Contemporary has been one of strategic and symbolic significance, rife with a lineage of protagonists that played important roles in the evolution of the city. Located at the intersection of Bonsecours and Saint-Paul streets in the historic district of Montreal — Old Montreal, — the site of PHI Contemporary (formerly the Auberge Pierre-Du-Calvet) consists of an amalgamation of four historic buildings that date to the 18th century and a large adjacent lot. In direct proximity to the Bonsecours Market (1847) and the Notre-Dame-de-Bonsecours Chapel (1675) - both storied landmarks of the city and its heritage. PHI Contemporary is poised to become a model 21st-century cultural institution and anchor in an evolving local and international cultural and artistic landscape.

International Architecture Competition 
On August 26, 2021, PHI launched an International Architecture Competition for the design of PHI Contemporary. The call for candidature elicited 65 entries from world-class architectural firms from 14 countries, from which 11 were selected to compete. The winning architectural firms Kuehn Malvezzi + Pelletier de Fontenay will pursue the mandate to develop their proposal and realize the architectural design of PHI Contemporary, transforming the site into a new cultural hub for Old Montreal.

Diving Horse Creations 
Founded by Phoebe Greenberg, Diving Horse Creations is a former theater company (1990-2003) dedicated to exploring theater through corporeal research. Here are some examples of projects within the company:

 L’école des bouffons<ref>{{Cite journal |last=Wickham |first=Philip |date=1995 |title=" LÉcole des bouffons " |url=https://www.erudit.org/fr/revues/jeu/1995-n76-jeu1072691/27962ac/ |journal=Jeu: Revue de théâtre |language=fr |issue=76 |pages=196–198 |issn=0382-0335}}</ref> (1995), from the Belgian playwright Michel de Ghelderode;
 Croisades (2000); by the French writer and playwright Michel Azama;
 La Leçon (2001); a staging by Oleg Kisseliov of the famous play by Eugène Ionesco;
 Elizavieta Bam (2002); a play by Daniil Harms.

 Film producer 

 Next Floor, directed by Denis Villeneuve, 2008 (This short film won numerous awards including the 2009 Jutras prize for best short film and the Genie Award for Best Live Action Short Drama at the 29th Genie Awards);
 Incendies, directed by Denis Villeneuve, 2010
 ÉCHO, directed by Edouard Lock
 Séances, is a 2016 interactive project by filmmaker and installation artist Guy Maddin produced at the PHI Centre
 Visitors, a 2013 American documentary film, written and directed by Godfrey Reggio
 Hope, Pedro Perez, by a play by Marie Brassard

 Awards and recognition 

 Officière, Ordre national du Québec, 2018
 Compagne des arts et des lettres du Québec, 2017
 Fine Arts Awards of Distinction de l’Université Concordia, 2013
 Hommage à Phoebe Greenberg, Gala des arts visuels, 2012

Phoebe Greenberg is active on various boards of directors (Infrarouge, PLUS1, Felix & Paul Studios and the international committee of the Palais de Tokyo in Paris).

In 2021, Phoebe Greenberg won her case before the Superior Court of Quebec against her former assistant.

 Notes and references 

 Next Floor, a short film by Denis Villeneuve, 2008
 Marc Quinn, PHI Foundation for Contemporary, 2008
 Take care of yourself, Sophie Calle, PHI Foundation for Contemporary Art, 2008
 John Currin, PHI Foundation for Contemporary Art, 2011
 Ryoji Ikeda, PHI Foundation for Contemporary Art, 2012
 Arcade Fire, PHI Centre, 2013
 Jake et Dinos Chapman: Come and See, PHI Foundation for Contemporary Art, 2014
 Arthur H, PHI Centre, 2014
 Allie X, PHI Centre, 2015
 Mos Def, PHI Centre, 2015
 Red Bull Music Academy, 2016
 Chilly Gonzales, PHI Centre, 2016
 Yoko Ono: Growing Freedom, PHI Foundation for Contemporary Art, 2019
 Spheres at the Rockefeller Center, 2018
 Cadavre Exquis, Centre PHI, 2019
 Ephemeral gallery, PHI Immersive: Theater of Virtuality, 2019 
 Ephemeral gallery, PHI Immersive: Theater of Virtuality, 2019
 Immersive programming, Tribeca Film Festival, 2019
 CARNE y ARENA, PHI Studio, 2020
 THE INFINITE, PHI Studio, 2021
 The virtual reality pavilion, Luxembourg City Film Festival, 2022
 Yayoi Kusama, DANCING LIGHTS THAT FLEW UP TO THE UNIVERSE'',PHI Foundation for Contemporary Art, 2022
 PHI Contemporary, 2022
 International Architecture Competition, PHI Contemporary, 2022

References 

1964 births
Canadian women film producers
Living people
Film producers from Quebec